Sherry Marts is an American consultant on sexual harassment and academic who advises scientific associations on how to address and ameliorate institutionalized sexual harassment. While Marts was a PhD student at Duke University, working in cell biology, she experiencing serious sexual harassment.

At Duke University, she was the co-chairperson of the Graduate and Professional Student Council (GPSC), an organization that she helped to found.

She spent 10 years in Washington, D.C., at the Society for Women’s Health Research, where she was the vice president for scientific affairs.

In 2018 Marts shared an MIT Disobedience Award, given to individuals who fight sexual harassment, with BethAnn McLaughlin and Tarana Burke. In 2020 Marts stopped associating with McLaughlin and stopped using the #MeTooSTEM hashtag.

In September 2019 she was appointed executive director of the Genetics Society of America.

Selected publications

References

Marts, Sherry
Sexual harassment in the United States